Jodie Ann Sutton (born April 23, 1968) is a Canadian curler.

She won a bronze medal at the 1992 Winter Olympics when curling was a demonstration sport. 

In 1996, she was inducted into British Columbia Curling Hall of Fame together with all of the Julie Sutton 1991–1993 team.

Teams and events

Private life
She is the twin sister of Julie Skinner (née Sutton), and were longtime teammates.

References

External links
 
 Jodie Sutton – Curling Canada Stats Archive
 Canada's Jodie Sutton competing in the curling event at the 1992 Albertville Olympic winter Games | ARCHIVED - Image Display - Canadian Olympians - Library and Archives Canada

Living people
1968 births
Canadian women curlers
Curlers from British Columbia
Canadian women's curling champions
Curlers at the 1992 Winter Olympics
Olympic curlers of Canada
Twin sportspeople